Aleksandr Alekseyevich Minayev (11 August 1954 – 6 December 2018) was a Russian football player and coach.

Honours
 Soviet Top League winner: 1976 (spring).
 Soviet Cup winner: 1977.
 Olympic bronze: 1976.
 European Under-23 Championship winner: 1976.

International career
Minayev made his debut for USSR on 20 March 1976 in a friendly against Argentina. He played in the quarterfinal for the UEFA Euro 1976 and qualifiers for 1978 FIFA World Cup (USSR did not qualify for the final tournament for either).

Personal life
In the first half of the 1980s, he was in a long relationship with actress Natalya Gundareva.

References

External links
  Profile

1954 births
2018 deaths
Russian footballers
Soviet footballers
Soviet Union international footballers
Soviet Top League players
FC Spartak Moscow players
FC Dynamo Moscow players
Olympic footballers of the Soviet Union
Olympic bronze medalists for the Soviet Union
Footballers at the 1976 Summer Olympics
Russian football managers
People from Balashikha
Olympic medalists in football
Medalists at the 1976 Summer Olympics
Association football midfielders
Sportspeople from Moscow Oblast